Mook en Middelaar is a municipality in the upper southeastern part of the Netherlands, at the northern tip of the province of Limburg and is a part of Stadsregio Arnhem Nijmegen.

Population centres

History
The municipality is situated in wooded rolling moraine landscape, created during the last ice age, about 160,000 years ago.

In Plasmolen the remains of a Roman villa from the 2nd century AD were found and on the banks of the Meuse are the remains of a Roman bridge. These remains are from the 4th century.

The Mookerheide ("Mook Heath"), situated on the border of Mook, saw the Battle of Mookerheyde in 1574 which was fought as part of the Eighty Years War. Spanish forces under Sancho d'Avila defeated the rebel forces of Louis of Nassau, who was killed.

The Mookerschans and Heumense schans were defenses on the Mookerheide probably from the 17th century.
(At that time the Mookerheide area extended all the way to the citywalls of Nijmegen)
The historical Mookerheideschans (defense work) has been restored and offers a beautiful view over the Meuse valley.

Middelaar belonged to Overkwartier (Upper Quarter) of Guelders or Upper Guelders. During the War of the Spanish Succession Middelaar was occupied by Prussian troops, and it remained German for about a century (until 1814).

In the Second World War a fierce battle raged around this area. In May 1940 the invaders were stopped by large bunkers 
on the Brabant-side of the Meuse, the railway bridge between Mook and Katwijk was blown up.
In September 1944 Mook, Plasmolen and Middelaar were in the front area and the war caused much devastation. While under fire of German guns that were shooting from the woods near Groesbeek, allied soldiers had to secure the Heumen bridge over the Maas-Waal canal that was an important hub for operation Market Garden. Fierce fighting caused the front to move so the little village, of which most houses were shot in this period, was liberated to fall back in German hands, to be liberated again.
Soldiers killed in this vicinity during World War II found their final resting place in Mook War Cemetery
Most inhabitants of Mook and Middelaar sought refuge elsewhere until the liberation.

To support the cement industry, sand was dug out in the fields next to the river Maas (known as 'Cuyksesteeg') which consequently lead to the forming of the Mookerplassen recreational lakes, between Middelaar and the Mookerheide. After a couple of floodings in the 80's and 90's a removable lock was built to save the area from flooding again.

Public transport
Mook and the municipality is served by three bus lines and has its own train station, Mook-Molenhoek railway station.

Notable residents
 Karel Martens (born 1939) a Dutch freelance graphic designer, specialises in typography
 Serge Daan (1940–2018) a Dutch scientist, contributed to the field of chronobiology
 Arjen Teeuwissen (born 1971), equestrian, team silver medallist at the 2000 Summer Olympics
 Marko Koers (born 1972) a retired middle distance runner, competed at three consecutive Summer Olympics from 1992

Gallery

References

External links

Official website

 
Municipalities of Limburg (Netherlands)